The Sunshine Makers is a 2015 British documentary film directed by Cosmo Feilding-Mellen, and executive produced by Omar Fayed. It is about Nicholas Sand and Tim Scully, central figures during the counterculture of the 1960s. It premiered at Doc NYC on 16 November 2015.

The score was composed by London-based musical collective The Heliocentrics and released on Soundway Records in 2017.

References

External links

2015 films
2015 documentary films
Films about drugs
British documentary films
2010s English-language films
2010s British films